Lamberton Castle was a castle located at Lamberton, in Scottish Borders, Scotland.

The castle was a stronghold of the Lindsay family. It was the caput of the Barony of Lamberton. Edward Seymour, Earl of Hartford during a expedition in 1544, destroyed the castle. No remains of the castle exist above ground.

References
Coventry, Martin. Castles of the Clans: the strongholds and seats of 750 Scottish families and clans. Musselburgh, 2008. page 318.
CANMORE - Lamberton

Castles in the Scottish Borders
Listed castles in Scotland
Clan Lindsay